Dodangeh-ye Olya Rural District is a rural district (dehestan) in Ziaabad District, Takestan County, Qazvin Province, Iran. At the 2006 census, its population was 6,002, in 1,637 families.  The rural district has 18 villages.

References 

Rural Districts of Qazvin Province
Takestan County